The Rainbow Warrior Conspiracy is a 1988 Australian-New Zealand mini series based on the Sinking of the Rainbow Warrior. It was written by David Phillips, and directed by Chris Thomson, and stars Jack Thompson, Brad Davis and Germain Houde.

Plot
From 1978–1985, the Rainbow Warrior was the flagship of the Greenpeace fleet, active in supporting a number of anti-whaling, anti-seal hunting, anti-nuclear testing and anti-nuclear waste dumping campaigns, during that period. In 1985 it was at the Port of Auckland in New Zealand on its way to a protest against a planned French nuclear test in Moruroa. It was sunk by a bombing operation by the "action" branch of the French foreign intelligence services, the Direction générale de la sécurité extérieure (DGSE), carried out on 10 July 1985. Fernando Pereira, a photographer, drowned on the sinking ship.

Cast

 Jack Thompson as Stuart Irvine
 Brad Davis as Neil Travers
 Germain Houde as Alain Mafart
 Louise Laparé as Dominique Prieur
 Peter Carroll as Louis-Pierre Dillais
 Guy Thauvette as Manignet
 Bruno Lawrence as Terry Batchelor
 Christian Manon as French Priest
 Alex Menglet as Velche

See also
 The Rainbow Warrior, 1993 film

References

External links

The Rainbow Warrior Conspiracy at screenaustralia
The Rainbow Warrior Conspiracy at BFI
The Rainbow Warrior Conspiracy at NZ Film Archive

1980s Australian television miniseries
New Zealand television miniseries
1988 Australian television series debuts
1988 Australian television series endings
Sinking of the Rainbow Warrior